Horsens municipality is a municipality (Danish, kommune) in Region Midtjylland on the east coast of the Jutland peninsula in central Denmark. The municipality includes the island of Endelave, and covers an area of 515.2 km2.  It has a population of 94,443 (2022).  Its mayor is Peter Sørensen, a member of the Social Democratic party. The main town and the site of its municipal council is the city of Horsens.

History 

On 1 January 2007 Horsens Municipality was, as the result of the Municipal Reform of 2007, merged with existing Brædstrup (except for Voerladegård Parish) and Gedved municipalities to form a new Horsens municipality.

The municipality is part of Business Region Aarhus and of the East Jutland metropolitan area, which had a total population of 1.378 million in 2016.

Geography
In the northern part of Horsens municipality near the town of Yding, the second highest natural point of terrain in Denmark, namely Yding Skovhøj at 170.77 metres (560.27 ft), is situated, immediately west of the highest and third-highest points of natural terrain in Skanderborg municipality.

Locations

Politics

Municipal council
Horsens' municipal council consists of 27 members, elected every four years.

Below are the municipal councils elected since the Municipal Reform of 2007.

Notable people 
 Peder Skram (ca.1503 in Urup - 1581) a Danish Admiral and naval hero 
 Søren Frich (1827 in Nim Parish, Bolund manor – 1901) a Danish engineer, factory owner and city Councillor who built the Frichs company in Aarhus
 Mary Westenholz (1857 in Mattrup – 1947) an influential Danish Unitarian, women's rights activist, writer and editor
 Anders Christian Jensen-Haarup (1863 in Nim – 1934) a Danish entomologist who specialised in Hymenoptera

References

Sources
Municipal statistics: NetBorger Kommunefakta, delivered from KMD aka Kommunedata (Municipal Data)
Municipal mergers and neighbors: Eniro new municipalities map
Printable/searchable municipal maps: Krak mapsearch(outline visible but doesn't print out!)

External links

 
Municipality's official website 
¨

 
Municipalities of the Central Denmark Region
Municipalities of Denmark
Populated places established in 2007